The Holy Land is a 2001 Israeli drama film written and directed by Eitan Gorlin and starring Oren Rehany, Tchelet Semel, Saul Stein, Albert Iluz, Arie Moskuna.  It is Gorlin's directorial debut.

Cast
 Oren Rehany as Mendy
Tchelet Semel as Natasha “Sasha” Sonsova
Saul Stein as Mike
Albert Iluz as Razi
Arie Moskuna as The Exterminator

Production
The film was shot on location in Israel.

Reception
The film has a 51% rating on Rotten Tomatoes.

Awards and nominations
The film won the grand jury prize for best feature at the 2002 Slamdance Film Festival and the best film prize at the 2002 Avignon New York festival.  Gorlin was also nominated for the Someone to Watch Award at the 18th Independent Spirit Awards.

References

External links
 

Israeli drama films
2001 directorial debut films
2001 films
2000s English-language films
2000s Arabic-language films
2000s Russian-language films
2000s Hebrew-language films
2001 drama films
2001 multilingual films
Israeli multilingual films